Győző Halmos (June 13, 1889 – c. 1945) was a Hungarian gymnast who competed in the 1912 Summer Olympics. He was part of the Hungarian team, which won the silver medal in the gymnastics men's team, European system event in 1912.

He died in KZ Mauthausen during World War II.

References

External links
profile
profile 

1889 births
1945 deaths
Hungarian Jews who died in the Holocaust
Hungarian male artistic gymnasts
Gymnasts at the 1912 Summer Olympics
Olympic gymnasts of Hungary
Olympic silver medalists for Hungary
People condemned by Nazi courts
Hungarian civilians killed in World War II
People who died in Mauthausen concentration camp
Olympic medalists in gymnastics
Medalists at the 1912 Summer Olympics
Hungarian resistance members
Jewish Hungarian sportspeople
Hungarian people who died in Nazi concentration camps